Shooting Star is an American rock band from Kansas City, Missouri.

The band was formed in the late 1970s. After gaining popularity in the Kansas City area, Shooting Star became the first American group to sign with Virgin Records. They recorded their 1979 debut album in England with producer Gus Dudgeon. The band gained national exposure when a number of songs garnered moderate airplay on album-oriented rock radio stations in the US.

Shooting Star initially consisted of Van McLain (guitars, vocals), Bill Guffey (keyboards), Steve Thomas (drums), Ron Verlin (bass), Charles Waltz (violin, keyboards, vocals), and Gary West (lead vocals, guitars, keyboards).

Early history
Shooting Star was formed in suburban Kansas City by childhood friends Ron Verlin and Van McLain (born Van Allen McElvain on May 3, 1955, in Kansas City, Missouri; died March 2, 2018). They were next-door neighbors and good friends. They created a band with their brothers, Craig McLain and John Verlin, and played Beatles records in Ron's grandmother's garage. Two years later, Van and Craig had moved to different school districts and the band split up.

Upon entering Shawnee Mission South High School, Van and Ron met up again. With the 1950s nostalgia craze of 1971 brewing, they played classic 1950s hits. After seeing Sha Na Na in the movie Woodstock, they added three dancers to the act and called the band The Shooting Stars featuring The Galaxies, the name inspired by Bill Haley & His Comets.

History

London and New York City

By 1974, Van began serious songwriting. The band decided to stop playing cover songs and perform their own music. Later that year, they recorded a four-song demo tape and planned a trip to London, England to shop their songs for a record deal. They left on January 6, 1975, and after three weeks of shopping their music to different record labels, they were offered a recording contract with Arista Records.

Upon signing, The Shooting Stars were then given the opportunity to play a showcase performance at the legendary Marquee Club in London. The band then made their way to Morgan Studios to record their first single, Take the Money & Run. Shortly after this record was cut, Steve Miller released his song Take the Money & Run, which became a huge hit. Arista Records then released The Shooting Stars from their contract, and they returned to Kansas City.

In 1977 Van persuaded fellow musician Gary West (born Gary Hodgden) to join them as a singer and songwriting partner. Gary, with his brother Ron West, had been a member of the premier Kansas City rock band of the 1960s, The Chesmann Square. After The Chesmann dissolved in 1974, Ron West formed the band Missouri and Gary West moved with the Chesmann's lead guitarist Jim McAllister to New York City. There they formed the group The Beckies with songwriter Michael Brown, formerly of the group The Left Banke, and former Kansas Citian Scott Trusty. The Beckies released one album on Sire Records. Upon Gary's return to Kansas City, he and Van began songwriting in earnest.

Later on, in 1977, they added Ron Verlin on bass, Steve Thomas on drums, and Bill Guffey on keyboards for a new lineup of The Shooting Stars. With the addition of Charles Waltz on violin, keyboards, and vocals in early 1978, the name was shortened to Shooting Star and they started recording demos in Gary's garage, all the while playing gigs around the Midwest.

After saving enough money and putting a press kit together, they tried to secure another record deal in New York City. Through connections that Gary had made while a member of The Beckies, the band booked a showcase at the punk rock club CBGB. The representative for a New York management firm was in the crowd that night and offered them a contract. With a management deal secured, Shooting Star returned to Kansas City to continue writing new material.

Virgin Records
Six months later, the band's management arranged for them to play another showcase at the New York City club Tracks. Three record companies, Atlantic Records, Virgin Records, and A&M Records, made offers to sign the band. Virgin, then a small British record label, succeeded. The label was looking for a rock group to break into the US market, and Shooting Star became the first American band on their roster.

In May 1979, Shooting Star returned to London to record their eponymous debut album with producer Gus Dudgeon of Elton John fame. The album Shooting Star was released in January 1980, and the band embarked on a national tour opening for Robin Trower and Triumph. With their debut, the band gained popularity with the songs "You Got What I Need," "Tonight," "Bring It On," and "Last Chance." "Wild In the Streets", a B-side release, was a staple of live show encores; the song was eventually released on CD as a bonus track. "You Got What I Need" ended up peaking at #76 on the Billboard Hot 100.

The debut album stalled out at #147 on the Billboard Top 200 and Van McLain explained his version as to why: "We had the number one most played AOR song in the country with 'Last Chance' and our record company, Virgin, had gotten into a fight with Atlantic Records, who was their distribution. We ended up not being able to get our album in the stores for six months. We should have sold a ton of albums from having that popular of a song on the radio, but when people went to the stores, they couldn't buy the album because it was not in the stores."

With the radio success, and Virgin switching over to Epic Records for their distribution, Shooting Star returned to the studio in 1981 to record Hang On for Your Life (July 1981) with producer Dennis McKay. The album generated FM airplay with the songs "Flesh and Blood," "Breakout" and the title track. "Hollywood" was released as a single and climbed the Billboard Hot 100, topping out at #70. In support of the album, the band toured with ZZ Top, Cheap Trick, Todd Rundgren, Jefferson Starship, and Journey. They appeared on the radio shows Rock Line, King Biscuit Flower Hour (KBFH), The Source, and Westwood One. 

Keyboardist Bill Guffey left the group after the recording of Hang On for Your Life. 

In 1982 Shooting Star began recording their third album, III Wishes (July 1982), at the legendary Caribou Ranch studio near Boulder, Colorado. At the helm was Journey producer Kevin Elson. Without missing a beat, they returned to touring with such acts as REO Speedwagon, John Mellencamp, Jefferson Starship, Kansas, and others.

1983 saw their continued collaboration with Kevin Elson on their fourth album, Burning (June 1983). This record produced the songs "Straight Ahead," "Winner" and "Train Rolls On."

In 1984 the band experienced the departure of bassist Ron Verlin, who had become disenchanted with the music industry. Bassist Norm Dahlor was recruited to take over for Ron.

That same year the band was asked to record two songs for the movie soundtrack Up the Creek. The songs were "Get Ready Boy" and "Take It."

Virgin Records then picked up Geffen Records as their distributor and the group began to record their fifth album, Silent Scream, with producer Ron Nevison. It was released in April 1985 and produced the radio hit "Summer Sun." The band's accompanying music video was popular on MTV and other video channels. Van, Norm, and Steve were also the backing band on Ian Hunter's single "Great Expectations." The band then toured with Heart, Bryan Adams, and ZZ Top.

Separate ways
In 1986, after almost a decade of touring and five albums, Shooting Star decided to go on hiatus. A farewell show was played on December 27, 1986, at Memorial Hall in Kansas City, Kansas and after a few more concerts, Shooting Star went their separate ways in late spring of 1987.

Gary West, with Van McLain's help, began work on demos that were more in a pop/rhythm and blues direction. CBS Records signed West but then lost interest. Guitarist McLain, in a 2013 interview with Goldmine Magazine, explained why the group disbanded: "We signed with Geffen, and we put out Silent Scream. Geffen got into a fight with all the radio promo guys, and they fired them the week our album came out. We had 200 ads on the radio, out of 300 reporting stations, in the first week. 'Summer Sun' was being added everywhere, and it looked like the album would be a smash. After the fight with the promo guys, it dropped to 40 stations. What do you do? We really worked hard on that record, and it was the one. It just crushed Gary when it all fell apart over something that ridiculous; It literally drove him out of the music business. You put your heart and soul into this stuff, and you expect these business guys to come through for you. We got hosed four or five times. Over the next several years fans from around the world were frustrated by not being able to find Shooting Star records, which all went out of print, while the band continued to receive radio airplay". Being dropped by CBS further discouraged Gary, and he left the music business.

In July 1989 V&R Records, the band's own label, acquired the rights to release The Best of Shooting Star. This release marked the first time that any Shooting Star record appeared on CD and included two previously unreleased songs, "Christmas Together," a 1985 single which had been played on Kansas City radio, and "Touch Me Tonight," a new song by Van which peaked on the Billboard Hot 100 at #67. Enigma Records, a heavy metal label that was starting to acquire more mainstream artists, bought the rights to the album and retitled it Touch Me Tonight – The Best Of Shooting Star. In the November 4, 1989, issue of Billboard, the album was the first album to reach that magazine's pop albums chart without being available as a vinyl record.

The band also released the first two albums on one CD called Shooting Star/Hang on for Your Life; it omitted two songs from the albums ("Stranger" and "Sweet Elatia"). This CD became a collectible until the release of the band's entire catalog on CD.

1990s
With the success of The Best Of and fans' desire for new material, Shooting Star was offered a new recording contract with Enigma Records. Returning to the group were original members Ron Verlin, Van McLain, and Steve Thomas. The other members were Dennis Laffoon on keyboards and vocalist Keith Mitchell. Charles Waltz was originally slated to rejoin but had moved to California and was busy with another band, Toledo Waltz, while Gary West had left the music business entirely. Thomas played drums on "Touch Me Tonight" but departed shortly afterward as he was unable to commit to music full-time during this period. He was subsequently replaced by Rod Lincoln. In Los Angeles, the band made a video for "Touch Me Tonight." It received extensive airplay on MTV, making their request chart and rose to #67 on the Billboard Hot 100. This was the highest-charting single of the band's career. The song also appeared in the Dolph Lundgren movie I Come in Peace.

In February 1991 the band released their sixth effort, It's Not Over. During the recording of this project, Enigma Records went bankrupt, and the group decided to finish it on their own. Released on their own V & R label, the album received critical acclaim throughout Europe and helped broaden the Shooting Star audience. After the album's release, Ron Verlin was replaced on bass by Eric Johnson (not the famous guitarist) and the band toured with Bad English, Bryan Adams, and 38 Special. After selling about 10,000 copies of It's Not Over, the group was contacted by JRS Records (whose parent company was SCS Music), which agreed to take over distribution of the album nationally. But the group became dissatisfied with JRS, claiming they did very little to promote the album, and filed a lawsuit against them on October 14, 1992, in Johnson County, Kansas District Court.

By 1993, disappointed over the collapse of Enigma, the JRS fiasco and the general decline in popularity of classic rock music, the band went into semi-retirement but resurfaced each year to play occasional concerts with Verlin back on bass.

In 1997 the violin became a part of their sound again with the addition of violinist Terry Brock (not the same guy who performed as a background vocalist with Kansas on their Drastic Measures tour).

In 1998, after recovering from a battle with esophageal cancer, Van was asked to perform at a cancer benefit concert in Chicago. On stage were members of Night Ranger, Cheap Trick, Survivor and 38 Special. Van received a heartfelt response from the fans and his friends on stage, which rekindled interest in playing again. Upon returning home from the show, he began writing songs and contemplated recording them.

In the summer of 1999, while vacationing in Nashville, Tennessee, Van was reunited with producer/engineer Kevin Beamish. Kevin and Van had met 20 years earlier while Shooting Star was recording its first album. At that time, Kevin was a young engineer for Gus Dudgeon. Out of this chance meeting grew the plans to record and release Shooting Star's seventh album, Leap of Faith (July 2000). The recording took place at Sound Stage Studios in Nashville, Tennessee from December 1999 through February 2000.

2000s
Shooting Star celebrated its 20th year as recording artists in 2000 with the release of Leap of Faith and a fall tour. Shane Michaels joined as the band's new violinist in May 2000, replacing Christian Howes (1999–2000), who had replaced Terry Brock. Original drummer Steve Thomas returned to the fold in late 2003 and singer Keith Mitchell left in the summer of 2005 after reported voice problems.

In July 2006 the group released the album Circles with Kevin Chalfant (ex-member of 707 and The Storm) handling the lead vocals, but since Chalfant was unable to commit to touring, he was replaced in 2007 by Ronnie Platt.

Original keyboardist Bill Guffey (born William Guffey III on July 28, 1952) died on April 12, 2007, at age 54.

Violinist Shane Michaels left the band in June 2008 to concentrate on another project, Flannigan's Right Hook, and was replaced by Janet Jameson. Bassist Ron Verlin, who had left the group twice before (in 1984 and 1991) and had taken temporary leaves of absence since his return in 1994, departed permanently in 2009; since then, Laffoon has covered the position of bassist.

Shooting Star was inducted into the Kansas Music Hall Of Fame on March 7, 2009. The band performed at Liberty Hall in Lawrence, Kansas with the McLain, Thomas, Lafoon, Platt, Jameson lineup, with special guest Ron Verlin on bass, and for two songs, original vocalist Gary West. Other former members were on hand that evening but did not perform.

Ronnie Platt left the band in 2011 to work with Chicago band Arra. His final performance with Shooting Star was in September 2010, leading to a period between 2011 and 2012 where, for the first and only time in the band's history, Van McLain was the band's sole lead vocalist (with occasional help from the band's violinist, Janet Jameson).

McLain spent the first part of 2012 focusing on a solo project to be released by Alligator Records before returning to Shooting Star in the second half of 2012 (This album, New Blue, finally received an official release in 2022, four years after Van's passing). Keith Mitchell returned as lead vocalist in 2012 but left again in 2013 due to health problems. Janet Jameson also left the band at this time. Topeka, Kansas native Todd Pettygrove, from the band Vandelyn Kross, then joined in June 2013 as the new lead singer, making his live debut with the group the following month at Moondance Jam in Walker, Minnesota.

Shooting Star returned to the UK in October 2013 to play "Firefest", the melodic rock festival that takes place each year at Nottingham Rock City.

In July 2014, former Shooting Star vocalist Ronnie Platt joined Kansas as the replacement for departing lead vocalist Steve Walsh.

2010s-present
Marking 35 years since their first album, Shooting Star released Into the Night in July 2015, which was initially available as a free download at the band's website.

During this time period, Van McLain, Dennis Laffoon and Steve Thomas, in addition to their Shooting Star duties, had also performed in the Overland Park, Kansas area as a trio – The Star Blues Band.

In September 2015 McLain experienced "flu-like" symptoms that became increasingly worse. After experiencing slurred speech, he was taken to the emergency room where he began to show severe symptoms of encephalitis. He was diagnosed with West Nile fever (only the second confirmed case of West Nile in Kansas in 2015). After several weeks of treatment for West Nile, Van began to move past the initial virus stage, but the virus had weakened him to such a point he had been hospitalized for over 8 months while dealing with a variety of respiratory and pulmonary issues that resulted from his condition.

On September 24, 2017, a special Shooting Star Relief Fund concert was held in Kansas City to assist McLain with his continuing recovery from West Nile fever. The concert featured members of the KC music scene including The Elders, 2nd House, members of The Rainmakers, and a Shooting Star Past & Present performance with Steve Thomas, Dennis Laffoon, and Todd Pettygrove performing with guests Gary West, Ron Verlin, Norm Dahlor, Janet Jameson, and Pettygrove's former bandmate Chet Galloway, handpicked and standing in for Van, on guitar.

Shooting Star had remained inactive since McLain's illness began in 2015. McLain died on March 2, 2018, from complications of his West Nile virus infection, at age 62.

Shooting Star announced in late 2018 they would play a concert on January 19, 2019, in Kansas City with a revamped lineup to include former violin player Janet Jameson and new guitarist/vocalist Chet Galloway. According to the band's official website, McLain's family fully supported a reforming and continuation of Shooting Star, and the current lineup planned to announce additional shows.

Personnel

Current members
 Steve Thomas – drums (1977–1987, 1989, 2003–present)
 Dennis Laffoon – keyboards, bass, backing vocals (1989–present)
 Janet Jameson – violin, vocals (2008–2013, 2018–present)
 Todd Pettygrove – lead vocals (2013–present)
 Chet Galloway – lead vocals, guitars (2018–present)

Former members

 Bill Guffey – keyboards (1977–1981; died 2007)
 Van McLain – lead vocals, guitars (1977–1987, 1989–2018; his death)
 Ron Verlin – bass (1977–1983, 1989–1991, 1994–2009)
 Charles Waltz – violin, keyboards, backing vocals (1977–1987)
 Gary West – lead vocals, guitars, keyboards (1977–1987)
 Norm Dahlor – bass (1984–1987)
 Keith Mitchell – lead vocals (1989–2005, 2012–2013)

 Rod Lincoln – drums (1989–2003)
 Eric Johnson – bass (1991–1994)
 Terry Brock – violin (1997–1999)
 Christian Howes – violin (1999–2000)
 Shane Michaels – violin (2000–2008)
 Kevin Chalfant – lead vocals (2005–2007)
 Ronnie Platt – lead vocals (2007–2011)

Lineups

Discography

Albums 

Studio albums

Into The Night was offered in 2015 as a free download.

Live albums

Compilation albums

Singles 

Promotional singles

Other popular songs

These songs received airplay on rock stations and were frequently performed live, but they were not released as singles:

Limited-edition vinyl single reissues

References

External links

Rock music groups from Missouri
Musical groups established in 1977
Musical groups from Kansas City, Missouri
Frontiers Records artists
Geffen Records artists
Epic Records artists
Arista Records artists
Virgin Records artists